Revolución, the Spanish word for revolution, may refer to:

Music
Revolución, a 1985 album by La Polla Records
Revolución (WarCry album), a 2008 album by WarCry
Revolución (The Dead Daisies album), a 2015 album by The Dead Daisies
La Revolución, a 2009 album by Wisin & Yandel
"Revolución" (song), a 1997 Enrique Iglesias song from his album Vivir

Other uses
¿¡Revolución!?, a 2006 Canadian documentary about Hugo Chávez
Avenida Revolución, the main tourist street in Tijuana, Mexico
Estadio Revolución, a sports arena in Coahuila, Mexico
Revolución metro station (Guadalajara), Jalisco, Mexico
Revolución metro station (Mexico City), Mexico
Revolución (Mexico City Metrobús), a BRT station in Mexico City
Revolución (Mexibús), a BRT station in Ecatepec, Mexico
Revolución, a Cuban newspaper merged into Granma

See also

 Revolution (disambiguation)
Viva la revolución (disambiguation)